Heller's vlei rat (Otomys helleri) is a species of rodent in the family of Muridae. It is endemic to Ethiopia and is found on the Arussi Plateau and the Bale Mountains.

Taxonomy 
Childs Frick (1914) initially described this species under the name Otomys jacksoni helleri. It was then included under O. typus (Ethiopian vlei rat) as a subspecies, and later as a synonym until Taylor et al. (2011) would elevated the taxa to species status.

Conservation 

It is listed as "Least Concern" by the IUCN, due to a vast area of occurrence.

References

Mammals of Ethiopia
Mammals described in 1914